Marinus "Tinus" Ringelberg (24 December 1892 – 1940) was a Dutch weightlifter. He competed in the men's middleweight event at the 1920 Summer Olympics.

References

External links
 

1892 births
1940 deaths
Dutch male weightlifters
Olympic weightlifters of the Netherlands
Weightlifters at the 1920 Summer Olympics
Sportspeople from Rotterdam
20th-century Dutch people